Mohammad Shahid Jabbar is an Indian football coach. He served as the head coach of the India women's national football team from 2010 to 2012 and also served as the head coach of Odisha women's football team.

Playing career
Jabbar played for Chand club in the local league and also represented Odisha in the Santosh Trophy at the 1993 and 1995 editions.

Coaching career

India Women: 2010–2012
Jabbar took over the reins of the Indian women's team in 2010 following years of inactivity since 2007 and took part in his first tournament as coach in January 2010 during the 2010 South Asian Games in Bangladesh. Jabbar led the India Women to the final where they faced Nepal. India Women managed to win the tournament by defeating Nepal 3–1. This was India's first ever championship in women's football. Jabbar then led the India Women to the 2010 SAFF Women's Championship in which they defeated Nepal again in the final on 23 December 2010 in Cox's Bazar by a score of 1–0.

Jabbar also coached the Indian team at the 2012 SAFF Women's Championship, where they successfully defended their title by beating Nepal.

Honours

Manager

India Women
SAFF Women's Championship: 2010, 2012
South Asian Games Gold medal: 2010

References

Living people
1965 births
People from Cuttack
Indian footballers
Footballers from Odisha
Indian football coaches
Indian football managers
India women's national football team managers